The Meztitla Scout Camp School (Campo Escuela Scout Meztitla) is the national Scout camp and school owned by the Asociación de Scouts de México, A.C., located in the Central Highlands of Mexico, northeast of the municipality of Tepoztlán, in the state of Morelos. Nestled under the rocky slopes of the  Sierra de Ajusco-Chichinauhtzin, in the Yautepec River watershed.

Background
The Meztitla Scout Camp School was founded through the generosity of Paul E. Loewe, who in 1956 donated the first lands to later become the campsite. Later more lands were acquired to become the modern Scout Camp School of Mexico.

The name Meztitla is derived from the original concept Place of the moon or Place near the moon in the Nahuatl language, due to nearby cave paintings in one of cliffs in the hills that surround the camp.

Several worldwide Scout events have been held at Meztitla, including Rover Moots and Indabas.

The Meztitla Scout Camp School is frequented by Scouts from around the world, and is also open to the public in general.

Important events

References

External links
Meztitla flash site (in Spanish)
Meztitla homepage
Native American News newsletter
Scout Traveler Mexico

Scouting and Guiding in Mexico
1956 establishments in Mexico